Christian Meier (born 16 February 1929 in Stolp in Pommern) is a German historian and professor emeritus of ancient history at the University of Munich.

In 2002, Meier was awarded the Austrian Decoration for Science and Art. He is also a member of the Norwegian Academy of Science and Letters.

Biography 
 
Meier attended high schools in Stettin, Rostock and Hamburg. In 1948, Meier passed his Abitur in Hamburg and then studied in Heidelberg history, classical philology and Roman law. In 1956 he received his doctorate under the supervision of Hans Schaefer. He completed in 1963 his habilitation in Frankfurt am Main. There he was a student of Matthias Gelzer. 

From 1964 he was a Privatdozent in Freiburg, followed by professorships for ancient history in Basel (1966), Cologne (1968), and Bochum (1976). In 1981 he was appointed professor of "Ancient History with special reference to social and economic history" in Munich, a position he held until his retirement in 1997. In the academic year 1984/1985 Meier was a Fellow at the Wissenschaftskolleg zu Berlin.

Meier is also co-founder of the Berlin-Brandenburg Academy of Sciences and Humanities and was from 1996 to 2002 President of the Deutsche Akademie für Sprache und Dichtung (German Academy for Language and Poetry) in Darmstadt. He is also a member of the Norwegian Academy of Sciences. Since 1989 he has been a full member of the Academia Europaea.

Research

As a historian he has claimed to write narrative history. Meier always looks beyond the boundaries of his subject. For example, he dealt with modern democracy and the politics of the Federal Republic of Germany, especially in the course of reunification.

In 1998 he was awarded the Cicero-Rednerpreis (Cicero Speaker Prize) for his own eloquence. On the subject of spelling reform, Meier, in his role as President of the German Academy for Language and Poetry, expressed himself in a committed and critical manner. in 2003, he was awarded the Jacob-Grimm-Preis for his commitment to the German language. 

In 2009 and 2015, the Universities of Salzburg and Bern awarded Meier an honorary doctorate.

In 2006, Meier was awarded with the Austrian Decoration for Science and Art by the Austrian Federal President Heinz Fischer. In 2009 he was awarded the Lichtenberg Medal, in 2014 the Bavarian Maximilian Order for Science and Art .

In 2015, Meier donated his private archive (manuscripts and correspondence) to the Deutsches Literaturarchiv Marbach, including correspondence with Carl Schmitt and Richard von Weizsäcker.

References

1929 births
Living people
People from Słupsk
People from the Province of Pomerania
Academic staff of the Ludwig Maximilian University of Munich
Recipients of the Austrian Decoration for Science and Art
Members of the Norwegian Academy of Science and Letters
German male non-fiction writers